JAH is a shortened form of the divine name Jehovah.

JAH may also refer to:

Academic journals 
 Journal of Aboriginal Health, a peer-reviewed journal
 Journal of Aging and Health, a medical journal
 The Journal of American History,  the official academic journal of the Organization of American Historians

People 
 XXXTentacion, often referred to as Jah (a shortening of Jahseh Onfroy)

Politics 
 Jamiat Ahle Hadith, political and Islamic religious party of Pakistan

See also
 Iah, a moon god in ancient Egyptian religion